The Chhota Udaipur State or 'Princely State of Chhota Udaipur', was a princely state with its capital in Chhota Udaipur during the era of British India. The last ruler of Chhota Udaipur State signed the accession to join the Indian Union in 1948. Chhota Udaipur shares a history with Devgadh Baria and Rajpipla as one of the three princely states of eastern Gujarat.

History
The erstwhile Princely State of Chhota Udaipur was founded in 1743 by Rawal Udeysinhji, a descendant of Patai Rawal of Champaner.

This state was an A class state with an 11 Gun salute under the Rewa Kantha Agency and merged with the Union of India on 16 August 1947. The state emerged as an A Class state mainly because of the erstwhile ruler HH. Maharaja Maharawal Shri Fateh Sinh Ji Chauhan who was also known as the people's Maharaja. Before him, the state was a second class state with 9 Gun Salutes. Maharawal Shri Fatehsinh ji made a lot of developments in the state of Chhota Udepur and quickly rose to being an A class state. His great grandson HH Aishwarya Pratap singh Chauhan is the present ruler of Chhota Udaipur but he is the youngest son of Late Maharaja Shri Virendra Pratap Sinh ji.

Rulers
        1762 –        1771  Arsisinhji
        1771 –        1777  Hamirsinhji II
        1777 –        1822  Bhimsinhji
        1822 –        1851  Gumansinhji
        1851 –        1881  Jitsinhji
        1881 –        1895  Motisinhji
        1895 – 29 Aug 1923  Fatehsinhji                        (b. 1884 – d. 1923)
 29 Aug 1923 – 15 Oct 1946  Natwarsinhji Fatehsinhji           (b. 1906 – d. 1946)
 15 Oct 1946 – 15 Aug 1947  Virendrasinhji                     (b. 1907-d. 25 June 2005)

See also
Rewa Kantha Agency

References

External links

Chhota Udaipur History

Chhota Udaipur district
Princely states of Gujarat
States and territories established in 1743
Rajputs
1743 establishments in India
1948 disestablishments in India